Machang Bubuk is a state constituency in Penang, Malaysia, that has been represented in the Penang State Legislative Assembly.

The state constituency was first contested in 1974 and is mandated to return a single Assemblyman to the Penang State Legislative Assembly under the first-past-the-post voting system. , the State Assemblyman for Machang Bubuk is Lee Khai Loon from the Parti Keadilan Rakyat (PKR), which is part of the state's ruling coalition, Pakatan Harapan (PH).

Definition

Polling districts 
According to the federal gazette issued on 30 March 2018, the Machang Bubuk constituency is divided into 11 polling districts.

Demographics

History 
The Machang Bubuk state constituency was originally named Machang Bubok when it was created prior to the 1974 State Election. It was then renamed during the 1995 State Election.

Election results 
The electoral results for the Machang Bubuk state constituency from 1974 to 2018 are as follows.

See also 
 Constituencies of Penang

References

Penang state constituencies